Milka Milinković (7 April 1955 – 13 June 2017) was a Croatian Paralympic athlete who mainly competed in javelin throw and shot put events. She was regarded as one of Croatia's most successful Paralympic athlete and her country's first ever medal at the 1992 Summer Paralympics after the independence of Croatia. She participated at nine Paralympic Games where she represented Yugoslavia from 1972 to 1988 and Croatia from 1992 to 2016.

In 1968, when Milinković was thirteen, she became paralysed after falling off a tree and received medical treatment and attended a rehabilitation centre in Kraljevica. Milinković died of a long illness at a hospital in Rijeka aged 62.

References

1955 births
2017 deaths
People from Sanski Most
Croats of Bosnia and Herzegovina
Paralympic athletes of Croatia
Croatian female javelin throwers
Croatian female shot putters
Yugoslav female javelin throwers
Yugoslav female shot putters
Athletes (track and field) at the 1972 Summer Paralympics
Athletes (track and field) at the 1976 Summer Paralympics
Athletes (track and field) at the 1980 Summer Paralympics
Athletes (track and field) at the 1984 Summer Paralympics
Athletes (track and field) at the 1988 Summer Paralympics
Athletes (track and field) at the 1992 Summer Paralympics
Athletes (track and field) at the 1996 Summer Paralympics
Athletes (track and field) at the 2000 Summer Paralympics
Athletes (track and field) at the 2004 Summer Paralympics
Athletes (track and field) at the 2008 Summer Paralympics
Athletes (track and field) at the 2012 Summer Paralympics
Athletes (track and field) at the 2016 Summer Paralympics
Medalists at the 1972 Summer Paralympics
Medalists at the 1980 Summer Paralympics
Medalists at the 1984 Summer Paralympics
Medalists at the 1988 Summer Paralympics
Medalists at the 1992 Summer Paralympics
Wheelchair javelin throwers
Wheelchair shot putters
Paralympic javelin throwers
Paralympic shot putters